Norther was a Finnish melodic death metal band from Espoo formed in 1996 and broke up in 2012.

History
Norther formed under the name Requiem (Lindroos, Korpas, Hallio) in 1996 after various early stage band formations. The band's debut effort was the album, Dreams of Endless War, released through Spinefarm Records in 2002.  The album entered the Finnish charts at position 17.  At the time, Norther was playing shows only in and around the Helsinki area.  That changed when the album Mirror of Madness came out in early 2003 (entering the Finnish charts at position 11).  The group toured with Dimmu Borgir and Hypocrisy in late 2003.  In early 2004, Norther released its third full-length album, Death Unlimited, which reached 17 on the Finnish charts.

Norther played several shows in 2005 and then recorded an EP, Solution7 (recorded at Astia Studio).  It landed in the official Finnish charts at position five.  Norther added Kristian Ranta's vocals afterward.  In the summer of 2005, Norther used Studio Fredman in Gothenburg, Sweden, to record their fourth full-length-album named Till Death Unites Us, with producers Fredrik Nordström and Patrick J. Sten.  Soon after recording the album, Toni Hallio left the band to pursue other interests; Heikki Saari replaced him at drums.  After its release in January 2006, Till Death Unites Us was number six on the Finnish album charts.  Later the same year, the band composed the theme song ("Frozen Angel") for a major Finnish feature film, V2: Dead Angel produced by Solarfilms, Inc.  The band is also featured in the film.  In February 2007 Norther released a new EP, No Way Back, released only in Finland and Japan.  The record hit number one in the Finnish charts.  Later that year the released Amoral & Drone, and supported it with a European tour.

Petri Lindroos quit as lead vocalist on 1 February 2009 and was replaced by Aleksi Sihvonen (ex-Imperanon) on 14 April 2009. Their sixth studio album, Circle Regenerated, and was released 19 April 2011.

The band made their final appearance at the Brutal Assault festival in the Czech Republic on 10 August 2012.

Band members

Final lineup
 Kristian Ranta – guitars (2000–2012), clean vocals (2004-2012)
 Jukka Koskinen – bass (2000–2012)
 Tuomas Planman – keyboards, synthesizers, electronics (2001–2012)
 Heikki Saari – drums (2005–2012)
 Aleksi Sihvonen – harsh vocals (2009–2012)
 Daniel Freyberg – guitars, backing vocals (2009–2012)

Former members
 Petri Lindroos – harsh vocals, guitars (1996–2009)
 Toni Hallio – drums (1996–2005)
 Roni Korpas – guitars (1996–1999)
 Tuomas "Stubu" – bass (1996–1997)
 Joakim Ekroos – bass (2000)
 Sebastian Knight – keyboards (2000)

Timeline

Discography

Studio albums
 Dreams of Endless War (2002)
 Mirror of Madness (2003)
 Death Unlimited (2004)
 Till Death Unites Us (2006)
 N (2008)
 Circle Regenerated (2011)

Demos and EPs
 Warlord (Demo) (2000)
 Solution 7 (2005)
 No Way Back (2007)

Singles
 "Released" (2002)
 "Unleash Hell" (2003)
 "Spreading Death" (2004)
 "Spreading Death" (DVD) (2004)
 "Scream" (2006)
 "Break Myself Away" (Online Single) (2010)

Videography

References

External links

 
 

Finnish melodic death metal musical groups
Musical groups established in 1996
Musical groups from Helsinki
Century Media Records artists
Musical groups disestablished in 2012